Keyser Nunatak is a large nunatak,  high, at the north side of the terminus of Reynolds Glacier, in the Haines Mountains of Marie Byrd Land, Antarctica. It was mapped by the United States Antarctic Service (1939–41) and by the United States Geological Survey from surveys and U.S. Navy air photos (1959–65). It was named by the Advisory Committee on Antarctic Names for Lieutenant Teddy H. Keyser, U.S. Navy, a navigator in LC-130F Hercules aircraft during Operation Deep Freeze 1968.

References

Nunataks of Marie Byrd Land